The Tilbury is a public house and restaurant in Datchworth, Hertfordshire, England. It was formerly known as The Inn on the Green and The Three Horseshoes.

Architecture
The brick building is Grade II listed and dates from the early eighteenth century with later additions.

References

External links

Grade II listed pubs in Hertfordshire